Jau may refer to:

Places 
 Jaú, a city in São Paulo state, Brazil
 Jaú do Tocantins, a municipality in Tocantins state, Brazil
 Jaú National Park, in Brazil
 Jaú River (disambiguation)
 Francisco Carle Airport, Jauja, Peru (IATA: JAU)
 Campbell County Airport, Jacksboro, Campbell County, Tennessee, U.S. (FAA LID: JAU)

Other uses 
 Jau, formerly Indian units of measurement
 Fabrice Jau (born 1978), French footballer
 Euclydes Barbosa (1909–1988), known as Jaú, Brazilian footballer
 Yaur language, spoken in Indonesia, ISO 639-3 language code jau

See also

Jahu (disambiguation)
Jaww, a village in Bahrain
Jau-Dignac-et-Loirac, a commune in Gironde department, France
Jau gok or Yau gok, traditional dumplings in Cantonese cuisine